Bismarck Public Schools (BPS) is a system of publicly funded K-12 schools in Bismarck, North Dakota. There are sixteen elementary schools, three middle schools, and three high schools. BPS also operates an alternative high school, a vocational center, and an early childhood program.

Schools

Elementary schools
Centennial Elementary School
Grimsrud Elementary School
Highland Acres Elementary School
Miller Elementary School
Dorothy Moses Elementary School
Murphy Elementary School
Myhre Elementary School
Northridge Elementary School
Pioneer Elementary School
Prairie Rose Elementary School
Riverside Elementary School
Roosevelt Elementary School
Saxvik Elementary School
Solheim Elementary School
Will-Moore Elementary School

Middle schools
Horizon Middle School
Simle Middle School
Wachter Middle School

High schools
Bismarck High School (Demons)
Century High School (Patriots)
Legacy High School (Sabers)
South Central High School (alternative high school)

References

External links
Bismarck Public Schools website

School districts in North Dakota
Bismarck, North Dakota
Education in Burleigh County, North Dakota